Jhegson Sebastián "Sebas" Méndez Carabalí (born 26 April 1997) is an Ecuadorian professional footballer who plays as a midfielder for Campeonato Brasileiro Série A club São Paulo and the Ecuador national team.

Club career

Independiente DV
Méndez joined the Independiente del Valle academy in 2011. By 2014 he had been promoted to the club's B team and made his first-team debut on 7 March 2015 in a victory over L.D.U. Loja in the Serie A Primera Etapa. After two substitute appearances, Méndez was loaned to Cultural Leonesa in Spain, making one substitute appearance for the club on 29 November 2015. Upon his return to the club, Méndez had to wait until gameweek 15 of the 2016 season to play his next game, appearing as a substitute in a defeat to Fuerza Amarilla on 13 May 2016. He followed that up by playing the full 90 minutes in six of the final ten games of the Serie A Primera Etapa and a further 12 appearances in the Segunda Etapa as he cemented himself as a first-team regular.

Orlando City
On 28 December 2018, Méndez signed to Major League Soccer team Orlando City. He made his debut in the season opener at home to New York City FC on 2 March 2019. In July 2019, Méndez was part of the Orlando City team alongside Nani and Chris Mueller that won the 2019 MLS All-Star Skills Challenge, beating teams from the MLS All-Stars and Atlético Madrid to win the $25,000 prize for charity.

On 7 November 2021, Méndez scored his first goal for the club on his 65th appearance. The goal, a spectacular knuckling 20-yard strike, was the opener in an eventual 2–0 win away at CF Montréal. It was the final match of the regular season in which Orlando entered knowing a draw would guarantee qualification to the 2021 MLS Cup Playoffs.

Los Angeles FC
On 19 July 2022, Méndez was acquired by Los Angeles FC via trade in exchange for $300,000 of General Allocation Money (GAM). Orlando could receive an additional $450,000 in GAM if certain contract conditions are met and also retained an undisclosed percentage of any future transfer fee.

With LAFC, he won both the Supporters' Shield, after a 3-0 win over Austin FC, and the MLS Cup Final, following a penalty shoot-out win over Philadelphia Union. At the end of the 2022 season, he was released by the club.

São Paulo
On 9 January 2023, Méndez joined Brazilian club São Paulo on a free transfer, signing a three-year contract.

International career

Méndez was a member of Ecuador’s 2017 South American U-20 Championship squad which reached the final of the tournament.

In October 2018, Méndez was called up to the senior Ecuador national team by manager Hernán Darío Gómez for the first time. He made his debut on 11 September 2018, playing 73 minutes in a 2–0 friendly victory over Guatemala at Toyota Park, Bridgeview, Illinois. In May 2019, he was called into the squad for the 2019 Copa América, his first senior international tournament. After sitting out the first group game, Méndez started against Chile and drew a foul from goalkeeper Gabriel Arias to win a penalty, Ecuador's only goal of a 2–1 defeat. He started the following game, a 1–1 draw with Japan. Ecuador were eliminated after finishing bottom of Group C with one point.

In June 2021, Mendez was named to the final roster for the 2021 Copa América.

Personal life
His uncle is former professional footballer and fellow Ecuadorean international player Édison Méndez.

Career statistics

Club

International

Honors

Los Angeles FC
Supporters' Shield: 2022
MLS Cup: 2022

References

External links
 
 Jhegson Sebastian Mendez Carabal at Federación Ecuatoriana de Fútbol 
 
 

Living people
1997 births
People from Mira Canton
Ecuadorian footballers
Association football midfielders
Ecuadorian Serie A players
C.S.D. Independiente del Valle footballers
Segunda División B players
Cultural Leonesa footballers
Major League Soccer players
Orlando City SC players
Los Angeles FC players
Ecuador international footballers
Ecuador youth international footballers
Ecuador under-20 international footballers
Ecuadorian expatriate footballers
Ecuadorian expatriate sportspeople in Spain
Ecuadorian expatriates in the United States
Expatriate footballers in Spain
Expatriate soccer players in the United States
2019 Copa América players
2021 Copa América players
C.S. Norte América footballers
2022 FIFA World Cup players